Steffen Ingebriktsen Toppe (12 October 1902 – 28 July 1979) was a Norwegian politician for the Labour Party.

He was born in Hamre.

Toppe was elected to the Norwegian Parliament from Hordaland in 1965. He had previously served as a deputy representative in the periods 1958–1961 and 1961–, shortly into which the regular representative Hjalmar Olai Storeide died and was replaced by Toppe. He was not re-elected in 1969.

Toppe was a deputy mayor of Åsane municipality council in 1945–1947, 1947–1951, 1951–1953, 1955–1959 and 1959–1961 with a short spell as mayor in 1954–1955. He was first elected to the municipality council in 1933.

References

1902 births
1979 deaths
Labour Party (Norway) politicians
Members of the Storting
20th-century Norwegian politicians